Jebel Zem-Zem is the name given to a mountain located north of M'diq below Fnideq in northern Morocco below the Spanish enclave of Ceuta. On its northern lower slopes lies an abandoned and ruined fort called Fortín Negrón.

References

External links
Colonialismo y transformación del paisaje en el litoral tetuaní: aportación del análisis histórico a la comprensión de los problemas ambientales actuales

Zem-Zem
Rif
Geography of Tanger-Tetouan-Al Hoceima